The Institut d'administration des entreprises de Versailles (also known as IAE de Versailles, formerly Institut supérieur de management) is a public business school, part of Versailles Saint-Quentin-en-Yvelines University in France. It is also a component of the IAE's network, bringing together 35 national business schools around France.
It offers 30 courses including Bachelor's degree, Habilitation, Master's degree and PhD.

References

External links
Institut d'Administration des Entreprises de Versailles

Versailles
Postgraduate schools in France
Schools in Paris
Versailles Saint-Quentin-en-Yvelines University
Educational institutions established in 2019
2019 establishments in France